Jozef Koščak (8 June 1903 – 10 January 1979) was a Slovak long-distance runner. He competed in the men's 5000 metres at the 1928 Summer Olympics.

International competitions

References

1903 births
1979 deaths
Athletes (track and field) at the 1928 Summer Olympics
Slovak male long-distance runners
Olympic athletes of Czechoslovakia
Sportspeople from Košice